Paul Anthony Hitchcock (born 23 January 1975) is a former New Zealand cricketer, who played 14 One Day Internationals and single Twenty20 International for the New Zealand national cricket team. He was born at Whangarei in New Zealand's Northland Region in 1975.

Primarily a limited-overs player, Hitchcock played domestically for Auckland and Wellington between 1997 and 2010.

References

External links
 
 

1975 births
Living people
New Zealand cricketers
Auckland cricketers
Wellington cricketers
New Zealand One Day International cricketers
New Zealand Twenty20 International cricketers
Cricketers from Whangārei
People educated at Westlake Boys High School